Catherine Emihovich was the former dean and current faculty member of the University of Florida College of Education.  In May 2002 she was selected as dean of the college.  Prior to this position, she was the dean of the College of Education at California State University at Sacramento.  She stepped down as dean on August 14, 2011, and took a year's sabbatical before resuming her faculty responsibilities.  She was the first woman to be dean at the college.

Dean Emihovich published a number of books. She was published in numerous peer reviewed journals. She presented over 100 papers at key educational conferences. She was diagnosed with brain cancer in mid 2019.Catherine died on August 21, 2021. She was survived by her husband Ron her sons David and Ben as well as her 5 grandchildren.

Education
 Bachelor's degree in speech from Syracuse University
 Master's degree in measurement and statistics from the State University of New York at Buffalo
 Doctorate in educational psychology from the State University of New York at Buffalo

References

External links
Emihovich named the Official Dean
Info on Emihovich
ICARE Profile of the Dean
Additional Info about Emihovich

Syracuse University alumni
University of Florida faculty
Year of birth missing (living people)